A Decade of Defiance 1993-2003: Complete Singles Collection is a compilation album by the American anarcho-street punk band Defiance released on Punk Core Records. The album contains all the previously released EPs and the later released Against the Law.

Track listing
Fall into Line – 3:35
Warfare – 3:08
Does This System Work? – 5:02
No Time – 4:18
Your Country Is Shit – 3:22
Fight the Real Enemy – 2:55
No Future No Hope – 4:47
Waste of Time – 3:40
Back on the Piss Again – 2:34
Too Close to Being Over – 2:18
Affect Change – 2:29
Fodder – 2:50
Burn – 4:11
Success Unattainable – 1:47
Concealed Genocide – 3:13
Hands of the Few – 2:26
Kept Docile – 2:31
I'd Rather Fucking Die – 3:21
Portlands' Burning – 2:07
Where Has It Gone – 13:09

Credits
Jocelyn Dean – Photography
Ben Halliburton – Cover Photo

Defiance (punk band) albums
2003 compilation albums
Punk Core Records compilation albums